Corvo is the Italian, Portuguese, and Galician word for crow, and may refer to:

Places
 Rio Corvo, a tributary of the Ceira River in the Serra do Acor, Portugal
 Corvo Island
 Corvo (Azores), the only municipality on the island of Corvo
 Corvo Airport, airport for Vila do Corvo
 Corvo, Cape Verde
 Corvo, Italy

Other 
Corvo (surname)
 Corvo (knife), a type of curved blade from Chile
 Il corvo (1761), a play by Carlo Gozzi
 Willys FAMAE Corvo, or simply Corvo, a Chilean military vehicle
 Corvos, a Portuguese band

See also
 Pontecorvo (disambiguation), including Ponte Corvo
 Corvus (disambiguation)
 Cuervo (disambiguation)